Jerkins is a surname. Notable people with the surname include:

Fred Jerkins III, American songwriter and record producer 
Morgan Jerkins (born 1992), American writer and editor
Rodney Jerkins (born 1977), American record producer, rapper, and songwriter

See also
Thomas Jerkins House
Jerkins-Duffy House